Colin William Ashburner Campbell (born 20 June 1946) is a British sportsman, who competed in track and field athletics and in the bobsled. He competed for Great Britain in the 1968 and 1972 Summer Olympics, before moving to bobsled and competing at the 1976 Winter Olympics, becoming one of only a handful of British athletes to compete at both the Summer and Winter games.

Biography
Born on the island of Jersey, Campbell was a sporty child who progressed through youth competitions to compete internationally in athletics for Britain. As a middle-distance runner Campbell competed in the 400 meters and 800 metres. He reached the second round of the 400m in 1968 and broke the British record in qualifying for the 800m in 1972, though running with an injury he did not progress out of the first round. He also competed for England at the 1970 and 1974 Commonwealth Games. He subsequently answered an advert calling for trialists for the British bobsleigh team and, having successfully competed in these, was selected for the 1976 four-man bob team, where Britain finished 13th.

Campbell retired to Jersey, where he was President of the Jersey Spartans Athletics Club for 15 years. Professionally, he moved between careers in banking and managing athletics and tennis clubs on Jersey.

References

1946 births
Living people
British male sprinters
British male bobsledders
Olympic athletes of Great Britain
Athletes (track and field) at the 1968 Summer Olympics
Athletes (track and field) at the 1972 Summer Olympics
Olympic bobsledders of Great Britain
Bobsledders at the 1976 Winter Olympics
Commonwealth Games competitors for England
Athletes (track and field) at the 1970 British Commonwealth Games
Athletes (track and field) at the 1974 British Commonwealth Games
Jersey sports executives and administrators
Jersey athletes